Huiyuan (334–416 AD) was a Chinese Buddhist teacher who founded Donglin Temple at the foot of Mountain Lu in Jiujiang and wrote the text On Why Monks Do Not Bow Down Before Kings in 404 AD. He was born in Shanxi province but moved to Jiujiang, where he died in 416. Although he was born in the north, he moved south to live within the bounds of the Eastern Jin Dynasty.

Huiyuan was posthumously named First Patriarch of the Pure Land School of Buddhism. His disciples included Huiguan, Sengji, and Faan.

Life

Huiyuan began studying the Zhuangzi, Laozi, and the teachings of Confucius at a young age. However, at the age of 21 he was converted to Buddhism in Hebei Province by the monk Dao An, a Chinese disciple of a Kuchan missionary. Hearing the sermons of Dao An convinced Huiyuan to "leave the family" and embark on a life of Buddhist teachings. Later, he founded Donglin Temple (East Forest Temple) at the foot of Mountain Lu. His teachings were various, including the vinaya, meditation, abhidharma, and Prajna or wisdom. Although Huiyuan did not take initiative in establishing relations with the secular world, he had contacts with court and gentry families. Huiyuan was on two occasions invited by the dictator Huan Xuan to take part in discussions about the status of the clergy, whose independence Huiyuan defended. Members of the cultured classes came to live on Mount Lu as Huiyuan's lay disciples to take part in religious life. Huiyuan also upheld a learned correspondence with the monk Kumarajiva.

In the year 402 he organized a group of monks and lay people into a Mahayana sect known as Pure Land Buddhism, the Pure Land being the western paradise of the Buddha Amitabha.

In the year 404, Huiyuan wrote On Why Monks Do Not Bow Down Before Kings. This book symbolized his efforts to assert the political independence of Buddhist clergy from the courts of monarchic rulers. At the same time, it was a religious and political text that aimed to convince monarchs and Confucian-minded ministers of state that followers of Buddhism were ultimately not subversive. He argued that Buddhists could make good subjects in a kingdom due to their beliefs in retribution of karma and the desire to be reborn in paradise. Despite the Buddhists' reputation of leaving their family behind for a monastic life, Huiyuan stated "those who rejoice in the Way of the Buddha invariably first serve their parents and obey their lords."

See also
 Buddhism in China
 Chinese philosophy
 White Lotus

References

Bibliography
 Bary, Theodor de (1999). Huiyuan: A monk does not bow down before a king. In: Sources of Chinese tradition, vol. I, New York: Columbia University Press, pp 280–286
 Ebrey, Patricia Buckley (1999). The Cambridge Illustrated History of China. Cambridge: Cambridge University Press.
Tanaka, Kenneth Kenichi  (1990). The dawn of Chinese pure land Buddhist doctrine : Ching-ying Hui-yuan's Commentary on the Visualization sutra, Albany : State University of New York Press

Zürcher, E. and  Teiser, Stephen F. (2007). Buddhist Conquest of China : The Spread and Adaptation of Buddhism in Early Medieval China (3rd  Edition). Boston, MA: Brill Academic Publishers, pp. 204–53.

334 births
416 deaths
Converts to Buddhism
5th-century Chinese philosophers
Jin dynasty (266–420) philosophers
Philosophers from Shanxi
People from Xinzhou
Jin dynasty (266–420) Buddhists
Jin dynasty (266–420) writers
Writers from Shanxi